Nunzio Ferraiuoli (1661–1735) was an Italian painter of the Baroque period, mainly of landscapes.

Born in Nocera de' Pagani (presumably Nocera Inferiore), near Naples, he was a pupil of the painter Luca Giordano and although later in life traveled to Bologna, and worked with Giovanni Gioseffo dal Sole. He also painted landscapes in the style of Claude Lorrain. He collaborated with Francesco Monti. Among his pupils were Bernardo Minozzi and Carlo Lodi.

References

 Getty ULAN entry.

1661 births
1735 deaths
People from the Province of Salerno
17th-century Italian painters
Italian male painters
18th-century Italian painters
Italian Baroque painters
Italian landscape painters
People from Nocera Inferiore
18th-century Italian male artists